Mount Manchester is the highest peak in the Dead Mountains of extreme northeastern San Bernardino County, California, in the Mojave Desert.

Dead Mountains wilderness
Mount Manchester is the highest point of the Bureau of Land Management wilderness area which comprises most of the Dead Mountains.

The Dead Mountains border the Colorado River on the east, and the Piute Wash of the Piute Valley on the west.

The closest communities to the wilderness area are Laughlin, Nevada, and Bullhead City and Fort Mohave, Arizona, located across the Colorado River to the east of the mountain range. The wilderness area can be accessed via unpaved roads west of Needles Highway, which connects Needles with Laughlin, Nevada and Nevada State Highway 163. More unpaved roads provide access to the Dead Mountains Wilderness from U.S. Highway 95, which runs north-south on the west side of the mountain range and connects Interstate 40 with the Las Vegas metropolitan area.

See also
Category: Protected areas of the Mojave Desert

References

External links
 Official Dead Mountains Wilderness Area website, BLM

Mountains of San Bernardino County, California
Protected areas of the Mojave Desert
Bureau of Land Management areas in California
Mountains of Southern California